Sri Lanka competed at the 2011 World Championships in Athletics from August 27 to September 4 in Daegu, South Korea. A team of two athletes was announced, however both athletes did not meet qualifying standards and are "wildcards".

The two athletes selected hold the national record in each of their respective events and were the only two Sri Lankan medalists at the 2011 Asian Championship in Kobe, Japan, both winning the bronze medal in their events.

Results

Men

Women

References

Nations at the 2011 World Championships in Athletics
2011 in Sri Lankan sport
Sri Lanka at the World Championships in Athletics